Euriphene anaxibia, the Helios nymph, is a butterfly in the family Nymphalidae. It is found in Nigeria and Cameroon. The habitat consists of forests.

References

External links
Type images at Royal Museum for Central Africa

Butterflies described in 1997
Euriphene